Basketettan is the third tier league of professional basketball in Sweden. Until 2017, it was the second tier league before it was replaced by Superettan. The winner of each Basketettan season is promoted to Superettan.

Current clubs

North

South

References

External links
Swedish basketball at EuroBasket.com

Basketball leagues in Sweden
Sweden
Professional sports leagues in Sweden